Leed is a former soft drink.

LEED is Leadership in Energy and Environmental Design, a standard for green building design.

Leed or LEED may also refer to:

 Leed Publishing, a Japanese company
 Rick Leed (1955–2017), American television and film producer
 Melveen Leed (born 1943), Hawaiian singer

Acronyms
 Low-energy electron diffraction, a characterization technique in crystallography

See also
 Leeds (disambiguation)
 Lead (disambiguation)